Huntington Park may refer to:
 Huntington Park, California, a city in Los Angeles County
 Huntington Park (Newport News, Virginia), a park in Newport News, Virginia
 Huntington Park (Columbus, Ohio), a minor league baseball stadium in Columbus, Ohio
 Mount Rubidoux, a city park in Riverside, California, formerly known as Huntington Park
 Huntington State Park, a state park of Utah
 Huntington Park (San Francisco), the most prominent park on the city's Nob Hill
 Huntington Park, New Zealand, a suburb of Auckland